The 1983 Polish Speedway season was the 1983 season of motorcycle speedway in Poland.

Individual

Polish Individual Speedway Championship
The 1983 Individual Speedway Polish Championship final was held on 22 July at Gdańsk.

Golden Helmet
The 1983 Golden Golden Helmet organised by the Polish Motor Union (PZM) was the 1983 event for the league's leading riders. The final was held on 15 September at Leszno.

Junior Championship
 winner - Piotr Pawlicki, Sr.

Silver Helmet
 winner - Wojciech Załuski

Bronze Helmet
 winner - Ryszard Franczyszyn

Pairs

Polish Pairs Speedway Championship
The 1983 Polish Pairs Speedway Championship was the 1983 edition of the Polish Pairs Speedway Championship. The final was held on 10 August at Zielona Góra.

Team

Team Speedway Polish Championship
The 1983 Team Speedway Polish Championship was the 1983 edition of the Team Polish Championship. 

Stal Gorzów Wielkopolski won the gold medal. The team included Jerzy Rembas, Edward Jancarz and Bogusław Nowak.

First League

Second League

References

Poland Individual
Poland Team
Speedway
1983 in Polish speedway